Robin Deiana (born July 18, 1990) is a French television personality, actor, model and breakdancer who lives and performs in South Korea. He was a cast member of the talk show Non-Summit. He is also currently a host of the TV show The Most Beautiful Days.

Personal life
Born to an Italian father and a French mother in Avallon, Burgundy, Deiana went to the University of Burgundy in Dijon, studying computer science, and first came to Korea as an exchange student at Konkuk University. He was first interested in the Korean media when he watched X-Man (TV series) on YouTube when he was in middle school in 2005.

Career

Celebrity and endorsements

He and Non-Summit cast member Julian Quintart were honorary ambassadors of the ICLEI world congress global network meeting, appointed by the Seoul Metropolitan Government, two "foreign entertainers" who "gained popularity after appearing on cable network JTBC talk show Non-Summit."

Filmography

Television series

Discography

Featured singles

Awards and nominations

References

1990 births
Living people
Breakdancers
French male models
French television personalities
French expatriates in South Korea
University of Burgundy alumni
French people of Italian descent